Past and present structures on Elliott Bay in Seattle, Washington, U.S. include:
 piers, wharves, terminals, etc.
 mills and industrial buildings, mostly in the 19th and early 20th centuries.
 trestle bridges, mostly in the 19th and early 20th centuries.
 Bridges of various types along the Spokane Street corridor

Although the focus is on structures built over water, this list also includes some terminals etc. built on fill. Especially in the early years, it can be difficult to make a distinction between the two. "[O]ne of ... [the] basic practices," writes David B. Williams, "was to drive a double row of pilings out from the shoreline, lay timbers across the tops of the pilings to form piers and wharves, and build out atop the wood. They could then dump material under these structures, undertaking the land-making practice known as wharfing out."

It is not possible for a list like this to be complete. In the late 1880s and 1890s, a lack of legal clarity about ownership of lands between the low- and high-tide lines resulted in a massive number of structures on the tideflats, mostly poorly built and short-lived. "The craze for salt water," remarked Judge Thomas Burke, had "broken out again with greater violence than before ... [with] lunatics of high and low degree ... like so many cawing crows on the mudflats." Even today, there are numerous small, anonymous piers and ruins of piers.

The geography of Elliott Bay has changed considerably in the period since people of European ancestry first settled in the Seattle area in the mid-19th century. In particular, virtually all of the Industrial District and Sodo, as well as all of Harbor Island are built on landfill; also, there have been a series of smaller adjustments to the terrain of the Downtown waterfront, including the construction of the Alaskan Way Seawall.

In general, when listing variants of names we have not listed minor variants such as "Yesler Wharf/Yesler's Wharf".

Before the Great Fire
Structures from before the Great Seattle Fire, June 6, 1889.

Besides what is listed below, there is the following from Daily Pacific Tribune, January 15, 1877: "Last year the Seattle Coal Company pushed out a new dock, as also the Seattle Gas and Seattle and Walla Walla Railroad Companies." The Seattle and Walla Walla later became the Columbia and Puget Sound. This suggests either slightly earlier dates for the Columbia and Puget Sound piers than given by other sources, or that they were begun in 1876 and not rapidly completed, or that short-lived piers were quickly replaced; similarly for the coal pier (presumably the one at King Street). Conversely, it suggests a slightly later date than given elsewhere for the "Gas Cove" gas works, although this could have been the addition of a pier to an existing operation. Also, that same 1877 article refers to a pier "for Mr. Isaac Parker, in the rear of his lot on Commercial Street [First Avenue South], and immediately alongside the Craig & Hastings Wharf." That suggests two structures south of Yesler's Wharf, neither mentioned below, at least not by those names. Even if the Parker wharf was never built, the Craig & Hastings Wharf appears to have already existed in January 1877.

West Seattle

Mudflats south of King Street
Prior to the Great Seattle Fire, anything south of King Street and west of roughly Eighth Avenue was on mudflats.

Central Waterfront

North to Smith Cove
As discussed below in section Trestle (and other) bridges, italics indicate structures shown on one or more maps, but little other evidence that they actually existed.

Ballast Island

Trestle (and other) bridges
Italics indicate structure shown on one or more maps, but little other evidence that they actually existed. As Matthew Klingle has written, "paper railroads... crisscrossed Puget Sound, routes planned and licensed but never built..."

Since roughly 1900 there have been a series of bridges of various types running east–west roughly along the line of Spokane Street; see List of bridges in Seattle.

Since the Great Fire

West Seattle

Harbor Island
Harbor Island is an artificial island in the mouth of the Duwamish River, where it empties into Elliott Bay.  Built by the Puget Sound Bridge and Dredging Company, when Harbor Island was completed in 1909 it was the largest artificial island in the world, at 350 acres (1.4 km²). It appears that no substantial businesses had opened on the island in 1911. Since 1912, the island has been used for commercial and industrial activities. Harbor Island was made from 24 million yd³ (18 million m³) of earth removed in the Jackson and Dearborn Street regrades and dredged from the bed of the Duwamish.

This list goes clockwise around Harbor Island, starting from the south end.

The 1971 harbor map shows much of Harbor Island south of Spokane Street, along with the area across the East Waterway on the Seattle mainland, as Terminal 102, POS [Port of Seattle] Container Facility.

Mudflats south of King Street
The mudflats south of King Street were filled in the early 20th century, forming present-day Sodo and the portion of the Industrial District east of the East Waterway of the Duwamish. Prior to that, contained numerous buildings on pilings.

For the post-Fire section, we are confining this to structures east of Commercial Street (later First Avenue South); structures to the west of that correspond more or less to the present-day waterfront. The mudflats south of King Street were filled in at various times starting July 29, 1895 and extending into the late 1910s or, possibly in some cases, the 1920s.

This list runs roughly counterclockwise, first running north up the east shore of the mudflats then turning to include both the north and west shore of the mudflats, as well as a few buildings in the middle of the flats along the early 20th-century rail lines before landfill was complete.

Waterfront south of Atlantic Street / Edgar Martinez 
The present-day east shore of Elliott Bay in the Industrial District and Sodo south of South King Street is entirely a product of landfill in the late 19th and early 20th centuries. The list here runs approximately south to north, going north to about historic Atlantic Street (now S. Edgar Martinez Drive), just south of the present-day stadiums.

As of the 2010s, the vast bulk of this area between Spokane Street and S. Edgar Martinez Drive has been combined into a container terminal, Port of Seattle Terminal 30. The only exceptions are:
 a small disused area
 Pier 28
 At the north end of this area, the Coast Guard facility, Pier 36
All from  except as noted.

Waterfront from Atlantic Street to King Street

The former S. Atlantic Street is now known as S. Edgar Martinez Drive. From here north, the waterfront faces the open water of Elliott Bay, rather than the channelized Duwamish River. Beginning in the early 1980s, the waterfront area roughly between S. Edgar Martinez Drive and King Street were combined into a 3-berth container terminal, Port of Seattle Terminal 46. All of the waterways between the piers were filled in.  As late as 1971, the Port of Seattle still distinguished Piers 42 and 43, and when the current three-berth configuration was first implemented, the southernmost berth was still known for a time as Pier 37 (see prior section), the other two both as Pier 46.

Central Waterfront: King Street to Broad Street

Broad Street to Magnolia

See also
 List of bridges in Seattle

References
 
 
 
  Three volumes. Prepared for U.S. Army Corps of Engineers, Washington Department of Ecology, Port of Seattle.
  Appendix begins at p. 191 of linked document and has its own pagination (15 pages)
  Updated January 2007.
 The City of Seattle Harbor Department Map of Central Waterfront District, February 1918

Notes 

Geography of Seattle
History of Seattle
United States history-related lists
Seattle-related lists
Lists of buildings and structures in Washington (state)